Verticordia attenuata is a flowering plant in the myrtle family, Myrtaceae and is endemic to the south-west of Western Australia. It is a shrub with a single main stem, small leaves and pink to purple flowers which fade to white as they age. It usually grows in sand in areas that are wet in winter, often amongst grasses and is found in coastal areas near Bunbury.

Description

Flowering time is usually from December to April.

Taxonomy and naming
The species was first formally described by Alex George in 1991 and the description was published in Nuytsia from specimens collected at Ludlow near Busselton. The specific epithet (attenuata) is derived from the Latin word attenuatus meaning "thin" or "narrowed" referring to the shape of the petals.

George placed this species in subgenus Eperephes, section Verticordella along with V. pennigera, V. halophila, V. blepharophylla, V. lindleyi, V. carinata, V. drummondii, V. wonganensis,V. paludosa, V. luteola, V. bifimbriata, V. tumida, V. mitodes, V. centipeda, V. auriculata, V. pholidophylla, V. spicata and V. hughanii.

Distribution and habitat
This verticordia grows in white to grey sand in winter-wet areas and in Eucalyptus woodland, often with weedy grasses. It is found in areas between Bunbury and Busselton in the Swan Coastal Plain biogeographic region.

Conservation
Verticordia attenuata is classified as "Priority Three" by the Western Australian Government Department of Parks and Wildlife, meaning that it is poorly known and known from only a few locations but is not under imminent threat.

Use in horticulture
In cultivation, V. attenuata is a vigorous, hardy and attractive shrub showing potential for use in large rockeries or as a container plant. Propagation is usually from cuttings and the plant grows well in well-drained sandy or gravelly soils in full sun or partial shade. Mature plants are moderately frost hardy and drought tolerant.

References

attenuata
Rosids of Western Australia
Eudicots of Western Australia
Plants described in 1991
Taxa named by Alex George